Andrea Picci is a conceptual artist and poet. His work concerns celebrity and identity.

Early life 
Picci grew up in Switzerland. He studied photography at ECAL, visual communication at ESAM Design in Paris, and has a MFA from Central Saint Martins in London.

Career 
In 2015, Picci staged an artistic performance in which he dressed as Pete Doherty, fooling some photojournalists and having his picture published on Le Parisien'''s front-page as Doherty's.

"By embodying a false Doherty on a photograph presented as a true one, the doppelgänger joined an appropriationist art process in a Richard Prince’s style, questioning the construction of identity (hello Cindy Sherman) and tackled our Society of the Spectacle," stated the French newspaper Les Inrockuptibles.

In April 2017, Picci published a book of poetry, Essais de gloire (Anatomie de mon coeur en été).

In June 2018, he showed a series of copies of historic paintings altered to resemble Nabilla Benattia. Benattia said she was "very flattered" by the exhibition.

In 2019, he published a series of Instagram face filters. The filters questioned user's relation to selfie.

 Publications 
 Poetry 
 Essais de Gloire (Anatomie de mon coeur en été), Éditions de la Marquise, Lausanne 2017. 

 Featured PZ World, IDEA ltd , PZToday , London 2018. REF 11545Futures Of Love, Magasins Généraux, Paris 2019. Link In Bio - Art After Social Media'', City of Leipzig, Museum der BildendenKünste Leipzig, Germany 2020.

References 

Living people
Conceptual artists
Swiss male artists
Alumni of Central Saint Martins
Year of birth missing (living people)